Gymnopilus acystidiatus is a species of mushroom-forming fungus in the family Hymenogastraceae. It is found in Jalisco, Mexico, where it grows in pine and oak woodland. The fungus was described as new to science in 1991 by Gastón Guzmán and his daughter Laura Guzmán-Dávalos.

See also

List of Gymnopilus species

References

acystidiatus
Fungi described in 1991
Fungi of Mexico
Taxa named by Gastón Guzmán
Fungi without expected TNC conservation status